Abdul Bokar Kan (died 1891) was the de facto ruler of the upper part of the Imamate of Futa Toro in the late nineteenth century.  This included parts of what are now Mauritania and Senegal along both banks of the Senegal River.  After his death, the French colonial powers took full control of the territory.

Abdul Bokar Kan was the head of the Booseya clan of Futa Toro. 
He formed an alliance with Muhammad wul Hayba, the head of the Awlād A'li of the Gorgol region.
The almami of Futa Toro at that time was Abdul Boubakar, but his power was nominal.
In June 1864 the Moors and Booseya Fula collaborated in plundering trade barges that had become stranded near Saldé, 
drawing savage French reprisals against both groups.

After Amadu Toro died, the lower part of Futa Toro was safe for French river traffic.
Abdul Bokar Kan was the de facto ruler of the upper Futa.  He had eliminated Tierno Brahin, one of his rivals, in 1869.
The Wan family, led by Ibra Almami, rivalled his power in the lower part of Futa Toro, but in the upper part he had gained full power. 
The French generally encouraged Abdul Bokar Kan and other Futa Toro strongmen when they attacked caravans in the region, since they hoped that would discourage migration away from the region to Kaarta.

Under growing pressure from the French colonial power in Senegambia, Abdul Bokar Kan did what he could to protect his land, income and power in Futa Toro through diplomatic means. In 1890 the French military embarked on a campaign to eliminate the last remaining autonomous states.
Abdul Bokar fled, but was assassinated by the Moors.
Abdul Bokar died in Mauritania in August 1891.

Notes and references
Notes

Citations

Sources

Year of birth missing
1891 deaths
Fula people